The VIII Games of the Small States of Europe were held in 1999 by the Principality of Liechtenstein.

Competitions

Medal count

References

San Marino Olympic Committee

Games of the Small States of Europe
Games Of The Small States Of Europe, 1999
1999 in European sport
International sports competitions hosted by Liechtenstein
Multi-sport events in Liechtenstein